Provonsha Wells (born July 20, 1998) is an American football tight end for the Philadelphia Stars of the United States Football League (USFL). He played college football at Milford Academy (2016), Northwest Mississippi Community College (2017), and TCU (2018–2020).

Early life and education
Pro Wells was born in St. Petersburg, Florida. He went to Dixie Hollins High School, where he caught 31 passes for 952 yards and five touchdowns. He also played high school basketball, earning all-county honors. In 2016, he attended Milford Academy in New Berlin, New York, where he caught nine passes for 205 yards and one touchdown. He transferred to Northwest Mississippi Community College in 2017, catching 19 passes for 304 yards and two touchdowns. In 2018, he played college football at TCU, appearing in four games a redshirt. He played in all 12 games in his second season at TCU, leading the team with five touchdowns receptions on 17 catches. Following the season Wells earned second-team all–Big 12 honors. In his junior season, he played in 10 games, placing fifth on TCU with 13 receptions for 195 yards and a team-leading three touchdowns. After the season Wells chose to forgo remaining eligibility and instead declare for the NFL Draft.

Professional career
After going unselected in the 2021 NFL Draft, Wells signed as an undrafted free agent with the Cincinnati Bengals. He was waived on August 16, 2021.

Wells was signed by the Philadelphia Stars of the United States Football League (USFL) on April 1, 2022.

Statistics

Post Season

References

Living people
Players of American football from St. Petersburg, Florida
TCU Horned Frogs football players
Cincinnati Bengals players
Philadelphia Stars (2022) players
1998 births